Eureka, Texas may refer to:

 Eureka, Crockett County, Texas
 Eureka, Franklin County, Texas
 Eureka, Navarro County, Texas